Travelling Light or variations may refer to:

Music

Albums
Travelling Light (Lesley Garrett album), 2001
Traveling Light (Courtney Jaye album), 2005
Travelin' Light (Shirley Scott & Kenny Burrell album), 1964
Travelin' Light (Shirley Horn album), 1965
Travelin' Light (Zora Young album), 1992
Trav'lin' Light (Jimmy Giuffre 3 album), 1958
Trav'lin' Light (Anita O'Day album), 1961
Trav'lin' Light (Queen Latifah album), 2007

Songs
"Travelling Light", song by The Fireman from the 2008 album Electric Arguments
"Travelling Light", song by Tindersticks from Tindersticks
"Travellin' Light", 1959 song by Cliff Richard and the Shadows
"Travelin' Light" (J. J. Cale song), 1976
"Trav'lin' Light" (song), first recorded by Billie Holiday in 1942 with Paul Whiteman, later covered by several musicians
"Travelin' Light", a song by Dierks Bentley featuring Brandi Carlile which was included on his 2018 album The Mountain

Films
Travelling Light (1959 film), a 1959 British naturist documentary
Travelling Light (2003 film), Australian film directed by Kathryn Millard
Traveling Light (1944 film), French title Le Voyageur sans bagage, a French film directed by Jean Anouilh
Traveling Light (2022 film), an American film directed by Bernard Rose

Other uses
Travelling Light, 2012 play by Nicholas Wright
Travelling Light, 2010 English translation of Tove Jansson's 1987 book Resa med lätt bagage